PiliPinas Forum 2022 is a televised interview series produced under the partnership of the Commission on Elections (COMELEC) and the Kapisanan ng mga Brodkaster ng Pilipinas (KBP). It is intended to feature candidates of 2022 Philippine presidential and vice presidential elections.

Cast

Candidates
For president
Ernesto Abella
Leody de Guzman
Norberto Gonzales
Faisal Mangondato
Jose Montemayor
Manny Pacquiao

For vice president
Walden Bello
Rizalito David
Manny Lopez
Carlos Serapio
Tito Sotto

Interviewers
Karmina Constantino (ABS-CBN)
Dan Andrew Cura (FEBC)
Tony Velasquez (ABS-CBN)
Bombo Elmar Acol (Bombo Radyo)
Bombo Jane Buna (Bombo Radyo)
Rico Hizon (CNN PH)
Pia Hontiveros (CNN PH)
Ricky Rosales (RMN)
Pinky Webb (CNN PH)
Dennis Antenor Jr. (MBC)
Cesar Chavez (MBC)
Deo Macalma (MBC)
Angelo Palmones (MBC)
Maricel Halili (TV5)
Shawn Yao (TV5)
Ed Lingao (TV5)
Jay Taruc (TV5)

Production
PiliPinas Forum 2022 was organized after the last two of the five planned debates of Commission on Elections (COMELEC) and Impact Hub's PiliPinas Debates 2022 was cancelled. PiliPinas Forum 2022 in contrast to PiliPinas Debates 2022 which was a series of debates broadcast live, will be a collection of pre-taped interviews involving candidates of the 2022 Philippine presidential and vice presidential elections with a three-member panel whose composition is sourced from a pool of interviewers provided by television and radio networks. The candidates were given until noon of April 29, 2022 to confirm their participation in the interviews.

Broadcast
PiliPinas Forum 2022 will air from May 3 to May 6, 2022. The participating television and/or radio networks for the PiliPinas Forum 2022 are the Manila Broadcasting Company, Bombo Radyo Philippines, Radio Mindanao Network, ABS-CBN Corporation, TV5 Network Inc., CNN Philippines, Radyo Pilipino, Primax Broadcasting Network, and Vanguard Broadcasting. The order of airing by candidate will be determined through a drawing of lots. The order was announced on May 2, 2022.

Notes

References

2022 Philippine television series debuts
Philippine television specials
Filipino-language television shows
2022 in the Philippines
Simulcasts
2022 television specials
2022 Philippine presidential election